Ejecta is material that is ejected from an area, such as from a volcanic or stellar eruption.

Ejecta may also refer to:

 Ejecta (band), former name of the American synthpop duo Young Ejecta
 Ejecta (film), a 2014 Canadian science fiction film
 Waste material eliminated from an organism through excretion
 The projectile(s) and other materials that leave the barrel when a firearm is discharged

See also
 Ejecta blanket, apron of ejecta that surrounds an impact crater
 Eject (disambiguation)